The 2022–23 Coupe de France preliminary rounds, Bourgogne-Franche-Comté is the qualifying competition to decide which teams from the leagues of the Bourgogne-Franche-Comté region of France take part in the main competition from the seventh round.

A total of eight teams will qualify from the Bourgogne-Franche-Comté preliminary rounds.

In 2021–22, Jura Sud Foot progressed the furthest in the competition, reaching the round of 32, where they were beaten by AS Saint-Étienne in a game marred by crowd trouble.

Draws and fixtures
On 13 July 2022, the league announced that 401 teams had entered from the region. On the same day the first round draw was published, with 324 teams from Régional 2 and below involved in 166 ties, and 23 teams from Régional 2 and Régional 3 exempted.

The second round draw was published on 23 August 2022, with 108 ties and 50 new entrants comprising the exempted first round teams and the teams from Régional 1. The third round draw, including the 12 teams from Championnat National 3, was published on 30 August 2022.

The fourth round draw was published on 13 September 2022, with four teams from Championnat National 2 entering at this stage.

The fifth and sixth round draws were published on 27 September 2022.

First round
These matches were played on 20 and 21 August 2022.

Second round
These matches were played on 27 and 28 August 2022.

Third round
These matches were played on 10 and 11 September 2022.

Fourth round
These matches were played on 24 and 25 September 2022.

Fifth round
These matches were played on 8 and 9 October 2022.

Sixth round
These matches were played on 15 and 16 October 2022.

References

Preliminary rounds